Gochnatia polymorpha, the candeia or cambará, is a South American tree species in the family Asteraceae, native to Brazil, Bolivia, and Paraguay.

References

Plants described in 1832
Flora of South America
Gochnatioideae
Taxa named by Ángel Lulio Cabrera